Ante Pavelić may refer to:

 Ante Pavelić (1889–1959), leader of Croatian Fascists (Ustaše) and Poglavnik of the Independent State of Croatia (1941-1945)
 Ante Pavelić (1869–1938), Croatian and Yugoslav politician, vice-president of the National Council of Slovenes, Croats and Serbs (1918)
 Ante Smith Pavelić (1903–1985), Croatian and Yugoslav diplomat and publicist, son of Ante Pavelić (1869–1938)